Li Gang is the name of:

 Li Gang (Song dynasty) (1083–1140), Song dynasty politician and general
 Li Gang (People's Armed Police) (:zh:李刚 (武警); 1922–2001), first commander of the Chinese People's Armed Police
 Li Gang (footballer) (born 1981), Chinese association footballer

See also
 Li Gang incident, 2010 scandal in China
 Ligang, a township in Pingtung County, Taiwan